Mycobacterium heckeshornense is a species of the phylum Actinomycetota (Gram-positive bacteria with high guanine and cytosine content, one of the dominant phyla of all bacteria), belonging to the genus Mycobacterium.

Description
Gram-positive, nonmotile and acid-fast rods. Cells are typically rod-shaped, with some coccoid forms.

Colony characteristics
Smooth, yellow scotochromogenic colonies appear after 4 weeks of culture.

Physiology
Slowly growing organism, colonies appear after 4 weeks of growth.
Able to grow at 37 °C and 45 °C.

Differential characteristics
The phylogenetic position of this species is within the cluster defined by M. xenopi and M. botniense.
Key differentiating features are negative tests for arylsulfatase and pyrazinamidase and susceptibility to antimycobacterial drugs.

Pathogenesis
Seems to be pathogenic in immunocompetent humans.
Biosafety level unknown

Type strain
The type strain was isolated from human lung by bronchoscopy.
Strain S369 = CCUG 51897 = DSM 44428

References

Roth et al. 2000.  Mycobacterium heckeshornense sp. nov., a new pathogenic slowly growing Mycobacterium sp. causing cavitary lung disease in an immunocompetent patient. J. Clin. Microbiol.,38, 4102–4107.

External links
Type strain of Mycobacterium heckeshornense at BacDive -  the Bacterial Diversity Metadatabase

Acid-fast bacilli
heckeshornense
Bacteria described in 2001